100 ft Robot Golf is a mecha golf video game, developed and published by No Goblin. It was released in October 2016 for PlayStation 4 and PlayStation VR, and in March 2017 for Windows.

Gameplay
Players choose from a number of mechas to play through golf courses with. Each mecha has different abilities and gameplay mechanics for hitting the ball. As opposed to traditional golf, all golfers play at the same time, with the goal of getting their ball into the hole first. Players can demolish buildings to impede opponents, physically block opposing shots with their mecha, and physically attack the other competitors.

Pierce Washington from the Saints Row series, equipped with Zin Power Armor, is a featured character.

Development and release
No Goblin is an independent studio known for Roundabout, released in 2014. 100ft Robot Golf features in-game commentary by the McElroy brothers: Justin, Griffin and Travis.

Reception
The game has received mixed reviews, holding an aggregated score of 56 on Metacritic.

References

External links

2016 video games
PlayStation 4 games
PlayStation VR games
Multiplayer and single-player video games
Golf video games
Video games about mecha
Video games developed in the United States
Windows games